The Hong Kong–Shanghai Inter Club Championship was an annual football challenge match between two clubs representing Hong Kong and Shanghai. It was established in its most recent format in 2005 and folded in 2015.

History
The origin of the Hong Kong–Shanghai Inter Club Championship comes from the Hong Kong–Shanghai Cup, a competition first established in 1908. It was held 21 times in 40 years involving representative teams from the Hong Kong and Shanghai areas. Early editions were played exclusively among the many European expatriates based in the busy port cities. After 1948, the cup was not played for again until its reestablishment in 1987, and a match was then held consecutively for another 15 years until 2002, when it halted again for various reasons, including the outbreak of SARS.

In 2005, the competition was held again and for the first time featured two club teams, Kitchee from Hong Kong and Shanghai Shenhua from Shanghai. In 2006, the name Hong Kong–Shanghai Inter Club Championship was officially adopted to reflect the club nature of the competitors. However, it is unclear whether the 2005 or 2006 version is regarded as the first staging of Hong Kong–Shanghai Inter Club Championship. 2010 was the first time the competition was played in a two-leg format.

In 2015, the competition folded.

Results

Hong Kong–Shanghai Cup

Hong Kong–Shanghai Inter Club Championship

Winners table

References

 
Football cup competitions in Hong Kong
Football cup competitions in China
2005 establishments in China
2005 establishments in Hong Kong